Anusha Samaranayake (born 25 February 1962) is a Sri Lankan former first-class cricketer. He is now a bowling coach with the National Coaching Department. In January 2016 he was initially suspended by Sri Lanka Cricket for two months because of match-fixing allegations. However, in August 2016 he was cleared.

References

External links
 

1962 births
Living people
Alumni of St. John's College, Nugegoda
Sri Lankan cricketers
Cricketers from Colombo
Burgher Recreation Club cricketers